Ismail Al-Karaghouli (born 15 June 1943) is an Iraqi wrestler. He competed in two events at the 1968 Summer Olympics.

References

External links
 

1943 births
Living people
Iraqi male sport wrestlers
Olympic wrestlers of Iraq
Wrestlers at the 1968 Summer Olympics
Sportspeople from Baghdad